Karen Hansen (born 2 April 1959) is a Danish sports shooter. She competed at the 1992 Summer Olympics and the 2000 Summer Olympics.

References

External links
 

1959 births
Living people
Danish female sport shooters
Olympic shooters of Denmark
Shooters at the 1992 Summer Olympics
Shooters at the 2000 Summer Olympics
Place of birth missing (living people)